Cheruvu Kommu Palem is a village in Ongole mandal, Prakasam district, of the Indian state of Andhra Pradesh.

Geography and climate 
Cheruvu Kommu Palem's has a tropical savanna climate. The weather varies considerably, depending on the seasonal periods. July to September is the seasons for tropical rains, which play a major role in determining the climate of the village, and the village receives heavy rainfall from southwestern summer monsoons during these months. Summers last from March to June.

Demographics 
In the 2011 census, Cheruvu Kommu Palem had a population of 3,062 inhabitants, with 1,527 males and 1,535 females living in 829 households. Telugu is the official language, but Urdu is also spoken by large numbers of inhabitants.

References

Villages in Prakasam district